While I'm Dead Feed the Dog is a comedic novel written by Ric Browde, published by HarperCollins in 2000.

Summary
16-year-old Ric Thibault opens his mother's attempted suicide note that simply says: "While I'm dead...feed the dog." He can't stop laughing while the paramedics haul her away. While trying to get into the pants of the most beautiful girl in the world, his crush, Nina Pennington, Thibault ends up in the back of a limo on the road to rock 'n' roll fame opening up for David Bowie. But on the way there he stumbles upon a few things: a few dead Mafia hitmen, a nymphomaniac next door, dying Latin teachers, narcoleptic nuns, police, evil lawyers, buffoon reporters, televangelists and greedy relatives.

Film adaptation
In July 2012, it was announced that the film adaptation of the book, Behaving Badly, would start filming in Los Angeles. The movie was released in the United States in August, 2014, with a screenplay written by director Tim Garrick, starring Selena Gomez as Nina Pennington and Nat Wolff as Ric Thibault.  Browde has publicly disavowed the film as going against the source material of his book.

References

2000 American novels
American novels adapted into films
American comedy novels